is a Japanese film director.

He studied filmmaking at San Francisco State University. His independently produced film Weekend Blues won two awards at the 24th Pia Film Festival in 2001. His theatrical feature film debut, A Stranger of Mine (2005), won four awards at the Cannes Film Festival, and also earned him the Best Director award at the 30th Hochi Film Award.

Filmography
 Weekend Blues (2001)
 A Stranger of Mine (2005)
 After School (2008)
 Kagi Dorobō no Method (2012)
 The Disappearance of Conan Edogawa : The Worst Day in History (2014)

References

External links

Living people
Japanese film directors
San Francisco State University alumni
1972 births